Africa N'Da Blues is an album by Kahil El'Zabar's Ritual Trio featuring saxophonist Pharoah Sanders that was recorded in 1999 and released on the Delmark label.

Reception

In his review for AllMusic, Alex Henderson notes "the group couldn't have asked for a more appropriate guest. Like drummer/percussionist El'Zabar, he is a very flexible musician who is comfortable with both inside and outside playing ... this post-bop date generally favors an inside/outside approach and is more inside than outside. Most of the material, in fact, is quite melodic ... Thanks to Sanders' participation, Africa N'da Blues is arguably the strongest album that Ritual Trio recorded for Delmark in the 1990s." On All About Jazz, Derek Taylor said "Far from being formulaic in a negative sense El’Zabar’s preferred rubric for the Ritual Trio in recent years has resulted in some of the most stimulating music of his career. This disc, while at times adhering a little to  closely to the itinerary of past projects continues the successful streak substantiated by these earlier efforts. Thankfully it also demonstrates conclusively that Sanders retirement is still a long way off."

Track listing
All compositions by Kahil El'Zabar except where noted
 "Ka-Real" [take 2] (Joseph Bowie) – 12:38
 "Africanos/ Latinos" (Kahil El'Zabar, Susana Sandoval) – 9:52
 "Miles' Mode" (John Coltrane) – 7:21
 "Autumn Leaves" (Joseph Kosma, Jacques Prévert, Johnny Mercer) – 11:26
 "Africa N'Da Blues" – 7:34
 "Pharoah's Song" – 11:42
 "Ka-Real" [take 1] (Bowie) – 10:45

Personnel
Kahil El'Zabar – drums, percussion
Ari Brown – piano, tenor saxophone, soprano saxophone
Malachi Favors – bass
Pharoah Sanders – tenor saxophone
Susana Sandoval – spoken word (track 2)

References

2000 albums
Kahil El'Zabar albums
Pharoah Sanders albums
Delmark Records albums
Albums produced by Bob Koester